Yuma is a ghost town in Cloud County, Kansas, United States.  It is located near the intersections of K-28 and County Road 777.

History
Yuma had a post office for some time between May 1880 and December 1900.

A historical marker remains where the town once stood, which was populated from 1878 until the 1930s.

References

Further reading

External links
 Cloud County maps: Current, Historic, KDOT

Unincorporated communities in Cloud County, Kansas
Unincorporated communities in Kansas
Populated places established in 1878